Acadieville is a small rural community in New Brunswick, Canada situated on the Kouchibouguac River west of Kouchibouguac National Park. Acadieville has approximately 600 people.  The population is mostly French Acadian.  The Route is on Route 480.

History

Education

Notable people

See also
List of communities in New Brunswick

References

Settlements in New Brunswick
Communities in Kent County, New Brunswick